Alexander Davletovich Almetov (January 18, 1940 – September 21, 1992) was an ice hockey player who played as a forward for HC CSKA Moscow and for the USSR Team.

Career
Aleksandr Almetov was born in Kiev, Soviet Union. He was a member of the USSR Team from 1959 to 1967. He competed in the 1960 Winter Olympics, winning bronze. In 1963 he became the Honoured Master of Sports of the USSR. At the 1964 Winter Olympics he won the gold medal with the team, he played in all eight matches and scored five goals. He was gold medalist of World Championships from 1963 to 1967 and bronze medalist in 1960 and 1961. In 1960 and 1963-1967 he became European Champion, and in 1961 earned silver medal. He also was the USSR Champion from 1959 to 1961 and from 1963 to 1966. In 1965 Almetov was awarded the Order of the Red Banner of Labour.

Career statistics

International

References

External links 
 profile

1940 births
1992 deaths
HC CSKA Moscow players
Honoured Masters of Sport of the USSR
Recipients of the Order of the Red Banner of Labour
Ice hockey players at the 1960 Winter Olympics
Ice hockey players at the 1964 Winter Olympics
Medalists at the 1960 Winter Olympics
Medalists at the 1964 Winter Olympics
Olympic bronze medalists for the Soviet Union
Olympic gold medalists for the Soviet Union
Olympic ice hockey players of the Soviet Union
Olympic medalists in ice hockey
Soviet ice hockey centres
Sportspeople from Kyiv